Raphael Oliveira Assunção (born 19 July 1982) is a Brazilian retired mixed martial artist, he competed in the Bantamweight division of the Ultimate Fighting Championship (UFC).

Background
Born in Recife in Northeast Brazil, Assunção moved to United States with his immigrant parents when he was a child. He now lives and trains in Atlanta with Ascension MMA under Manu N'toh. He is also the brother of Júnior Assunção and Freddy Assunção who also fight as mixed martial artists. Assunção has a daughter.

Mixed martial arts career

World Extreme Cagefighting
Assunção joined the WEC in 2009, with a 12–1 professional record. He made his promotional debut on 5 April 2009 at WEC 40 against Jameel Massouh. He won the fight via unanimous decision.

He faced Yves Jabouin on 2 September 2009 at WEC 43.  Assunção won the back and forth fight by split decision.

Assunção faced Urijah Faber on 10 January 2010 at WEC 46. Faber won the fight via third-round submission.

Assunção then faced Diego Nunes on 20 June 2010 at WEC 49. He lost the fight via split decision.

Assunção faced LC Davis on 11 November 2010 at WEC 52.  Assunção won the fight via unanimous decision.

Ultimate Fighting Championship
On 28 October 2010, World Extreme Cagefighting merged with the Ultimate Fighting Championship. As part of the merger, all WEC fighters were transferred to the UFC.

Assunção was expected to face Manvel Gamburyan on 19 March 2011 at UFC 128, but Gamburyan was forced out of the bout with a back injury and replaced by Erik Koch.  He lost the fight via knockout in the first round.

Assunção next faced UFC newcomer Johnny Eduardo on 27 August 2011 at UFC 134. He won the fight via unanimous decision and was out up to 6 months with a possible nasal fracture.

Assunção faced Issei Tamura on 11 July 2012 at UFC on Fuel TV: Munoz vs. Weidman. He won the fight via second-round TKO.

Assunção faced Mike Easton on 8 December 2012, at UFC on Fox 5, replacing an injured Bryan Caraway. He won the fight via unanimous decision despite suffering a broken arm during the first round.

Assunção faced Vaughan Lee on 8 June 2013 at UFC on Fuel TV 10. He won the fight via armbar submission in the second round.

Assunção was expected to face T.J. Dillashaw on 4 September 2013 at UFC Fight Night 28.  However, the pairing was delayed and was rescheduled for a future event due to a minor medical issue for Assunção.  The bout with Dillashaw was rescheduled and took place on 9 October 2013, at UFC Fight Night 29.  Assunção defeated Dillashaw via split decision. The back and forth action earned both the participants Fight of the Night honors.

Assunção was expected to face Francisco Rivera at UFC 170. However, Rivera was forced from the bout due to a hand injury. Assunção instead faced touted UFC newcomer Pedro Munhoz. He won the fight via unanimous decision.

Assunção was briefly linked to a Bantamweight Championship bout against Renan Barão on 24 May 2014 at UFC 173.  However, Assunção opted to decline the bout as a rib injury sustained in his last bout at UFC 170 had not healed enough to resume the proper training in advance of the event.  Barão instead faced, and was ultimately defeated by T.J. Dillashaw.

Assunção faced Bryan Caraway on 4 October 2014 at UFC Fight Night: MacDonald vs. Saffiedine. He doubled the numbers of strikes Caraway threw and caught him with knees to win a unanimous decision victory.

On 22 December 2014, Assunção announced that he had suffered a broken ankle during training that would not require surgery, but is expected to be sidelined for up to 10 weeks.

A rematch with perennial contender Urijah Faber was expected to headline UFC Fight Night 62 on 21 March 2015.  However, Assunção was forced out of the bout as an ankle first injured in mid-December 2014 was slow to heal and that he was unable to resume the proper training to prepare for the fight in that time frame. Subsequently, in August 2015, Assunção's management team announced that he would undergo surgery on the ankle and hoped to return by the end of the year.

A rematch with T.J. Dillashaw took place on 9 July 2016 at UFC 200. He lost the fight via unanimous decision.

Assunção was expected to face Aljamain Sterling on 9 December 2016 at UFC Fight Night 102. However, Sterling pulled out of the fight on 23 November citing injury. Assunção was subsequently removed from the card. The bout with Sterling was rescheduled and took place on 28 January 2017 at UFC on Fox 23. Assunção won the fight via split decision.

Assunção faced Marlon Moraes on 3 June 2017 at UFC 212. He won the back-and-forth fight by split decision.

Assunção faced Matthew Lopez on 11 November 2017 at UFC Fight Night: Poirier vs. Pettis. At the weigh-ins, Lopez missed weight, weighing in at 138.5 lbs., three and a half pounds over the Bantamweight limit. As a result, he forfeited 20% of his purse to Assunção and the bout proceeded as Catchweight. He won the fight via knock out in the third round.  This win also earned him a Performance of the Night bonus award.

Assunção faced Rob Font on 7 July 2018 at UFC 226. He won via unanimous decision.

Assunção faced Marlon Moraes in a rematch on 2 February 2019 in the main event at UFC Fight Night 144. Assunção won the first fight by split decision at UFC 212 on 3 June 2017. Before accepting the rematch, Assunção negotiated a new contract with the UFC. Assunção lost the rematch in the first round after being dropped by two punches and then submitted via a guillotine choke.

Assunção faced Cory Sandhagen on 17 August 2019 at UFC 241. He lost the bout by unanimous decision.

Assunção was scheduled to face Cody Garbrandt as the co-main event on 28 March 2020 at UFC on ESPN 8. However, Garbrandt pulled out on 12 March due to kidney issues. As of now, Assunção is expected to remain on the card against an unknown opponent. Due to the COVID-19 pandemic, the event was eventually postponed. Instead the fight was rescheduled and took place on 6 June 2020 at UFC 250. Assunção lost the bout via second-round knockout.

Assunção was scheduled to face Raoni Barcelos on 27 February 2021 at UFC Fight Night 186. However, Assunção pulled out of the fight in early February after testing positive for COVID-19.

Assunção was scheduled to face Kyler Phillips on 24 July 2021 at UFC on ESPN: Sandhagen vs. Dillashaw.  However, Assunção suffered a biceps injury in late June and was replaced by Raulian Paiva.

Assunção faced Ricky Simón on 18 December 2021 at UFC Fight Night: Lewis vs. Daukaus. He lost the bout via knockout in the second round.

Assunção faced Victor Henry on October 15, 2022, at UFC Fight Night 212. He won the fight via unanimous decision.

Assunção was scheduled to face Kyler Phillips on March 11, 2023 at UFC Fight Night 221.  However, Phillips withdrew from the event for undisclosed reasons, and he was replaced by Davey Grant. He lost the fight via a reverse triangle choke technical submission in the third round and Assunção announced his retirement during the post-fight interview.

Championships and achievements

Mixed martial arts
Ultimate Fighting Championship
Fight of the Night (One time) vs. T.J. Dillashaw 
Performance of the Night (One time) vs. Matthew Lopez
Most total fight time in UFC Bantamweight division history (3:44:19)
Tied (Pedro Munhoz) for most bouts in UFC Bantamweight division history (18)
Most decision bouts in UFC Bantamweight division history (11)
Most decision wins in UFC Bantamweight division history (9)
Tied for second longest win streak in UFC Bantamweight history (7)
Tied (Takeya Mizugaki & Yves Jabouin) for most split decision wins in UFC Bantamweight division history (3)

Mixed martial arts record

|-
|Loss
|align=center|28–10
|Davey Grant
|Technical Submission (reverse triangle choke)
|UFC Fight Night: Yan vs. Dvalishvili
|
|align=center|3
|align=center|4:43
|Las Vegas, Nevada, United States
|
|-
|Win
|align=center|28–9
|Victor Henry
|Decision (unanimous)
|UFC Fight Night: Grasso vs. Araújo
|
|align=center|3
|align=center|5:00
|Las Vegas, Nevada, United States
|
|-
|Loss
|align=center|27–9
|Ricky Simón
|KO (punches)
|UFC Fight Night: Lewis vs. Daukaus
|
|align=center|2
|align=center|2:14
|Las Vegas, Nevada, United States
|
|-
|Loss
|align=center|27–8
|Cody Garbrandt
|KO (punch)
|UFC 250
|
|align=center|2
|align=center|4:59
|Las Vegas, Nevada, United States
|
|-
|Loss
|align=center|27–7
|Cory Sandhagen
|Decision (unanimous)
|UFC 241 
|
|align=center|3
|align=center|5:00
|Anaheim, California, United States
|
|-
|Loss
|align=center|27–6
|Marlon Moraes
|Submission (guillotine choke)
|UFC Fight Night: Assunção vs. Moraes 2
|
|align=center|1
|align=center|3:17
|Fortaleza, Brazil 
|
|-
|Win
|align=center|27–5
|Rob Font
|Decision (unanimous)
|UFC 226 
|
|align=center|3
|align=center|5:00
|Las Vegas, Nevada, United States
|
|-
|Win
|align=center|26–5
|Matthew Lopez
|KO (punch)
|UFC Fight Night: Poirier vs. Pettis
|
|align=center|3
|align=center|1:50
|Norfolk, Virginia, United States
|
|-
|Win
|align=center|25–5
|Marlon Moraes
|Decision (split)
|UFC 212
|
|align=center|3
|align=center|5:00
|Rio de Janeiro, Brazil
|
|-
|Win
|align=center|24–5
|Aljamain Sterling
|Decision (split)
|UFC on Fox: Shevchenko vs. Peña
|
|align=center|3
|align=center|5:00
|Denver, Colorado, United States
|
|-
|Loss
|align=center|23–5
|T.J. Dillashaw
|Decision (unanimous)
|UFC 200
|
|align=center|3
|align=center|5:00
|Las Vegas, Nevada, United States
| 
|-
|Win
|align=center|23–4
|Bryan Caraway
|Decision (unanimous)
|UFC Fight Night: MacDonald vs. Saffiedine
|
|align=center|3
|align=center|5:00
|Halifax, Nova Scotia, Canada
|
|-
|Win
|align=center| 22–4
| Pedro Munhoz
| Decision (unanimous)
| UFC 170
| 
|align=center| 3
|align=center| 5:00
| Las Vegas, Nevada, United States
| 
|-
|Win 
|align=center| 21–4
| T.J. Dillashaw
| Decision (split)
| UFC Fight Night: Maia vs. Shields
| 
|align=center| 3
|align=center| 5:00
| Barueri, Brazil
| 
|-
|Win
|align=center| 20–4
| Vaughan Lee
| Submission (armbar)
| UFC on Fuel TV: Nogueira vs. Werdum
| 
|align=center| 2
|align=center| 1:51
| Fortaleza, Brazil
| 
|-
|Win
|align=center| 19–4
| Mike Easton
| Decision (unanimous)
| UFC on Fox: Henderson vs. Diaz
| 
|align=center| 3
|align=center| 5:00
| Seattle, Washington, United States
| 
|-
|Win
|align=center| 18–4
| Issei Tamura
| TKO (punches)
| UFC on Fuel TV: Munoz vs. Weidman
| 
|align=center| 2
|align=center| 0:25
| San Jose, California, United States
| 
|-
|Win
|align=center| 17–4
| Johnny Eduardo
| Decision (unanimous)
| UFC 134
| 
|align=center| 3
|align=center| 5:00
| Rio de Janeiro, Brazil
| 
|-
| Loss
|align=center| 16–4
| Erik Koch
| KO (punch)
| UFC 128
| 
|align=center| 1
|align=center| 2:32
| Newark, New Jersey, United States
| 
|-
| Win
|align=center| 16–3
| LC Davis
| Decision (unanimous)
| WEC 52
| 
|align=center| 3
|align=center| 5:00
| Las Vegas, Nevada, United States
| 
|-
| Loss
|align=center| 15–3
| Diego Nunes
| Decision (split)
| WEC 49
| 
|align=center| 3
|align=center| 5:00
| Edmonton, Alberta, Canada
| 
|-
| Loss
|align=center| 15–2
| Urijah Faber
| Submission (rear-naked choke)
| WEC 46
| 
|align=center| 3
|align=center| 3:49
| Sacramento, California, United States
| 
|-
| Win
|align=center| 15–1
| Yves Jabouin
| Decision (split)
| WEC 43
| 
|align=center| 3
|align=center| 5:00
| San Antonio, Texas, United States
| 
|-
| Win
|align=center| 14–1
| Jameel Massouh
| Decision (unanimous)
| WEC 40
| 
|align=center| 3
|align=center| 5:00
| Chicago, Illinois, United States
| 
|-
| Win
|align=center| 13–1
| Joe Pearson
| TKO (punches)
| IHC 12: Resurrection
| 
|align=center| 1
|align=center| 0:12
| Chicago, Illinois, United States
| 
|-
| Win
|align=center| 12–1
| Aaron Williams
| Submission (armbar)
| AFL: Eruption
| 
|align=center| 1
|align=center| 3:22
| Lexington, Kentucky, United States
| 
|-
| Win
|align=center| 11–1
| Kevin Gittemeir
| Decision (unanimous)
| ISCF: Head-On Collision
| 
|align=center| 3
|align=center| 5:00
| Kennesaw, Georgia, United States
| 
|-
| Win
|align=center| 10–1
| Tyler Grunwald
| Submission (triangle choke)
| ISCF: Battle of Rome 2
| 
|align=center| 1
|align=center| 0:56
| Rome, Georgia, United States
| 
|-
| Loss
|align=center| 9–1
| Jeff Curran
| Decision (majority)
| XFO 13: Operation Beatdown
| 
|align=center| 3
|align=center| 5:00
| Hoffman Estates, Illinois, United States
| 
|-
| Win
|align=center| 9–0
| James Birdsley
| Submission (rear-naked choke)
| Border Warz
| 
|align=center| 3
|align=center| 1:42
| Colorado Springs, Colorado, United States
| 
|-
| Win
|align=center| 8–0
| Nick Mamalis
| Submission (armbar)
| ROF 26: Relentless
| 
|align=center| 1
|align=center| 3:35
| Castle Rock, Colorado, United States
| 
|-
| Win
|align=center| 7–0
| Joe Lauzon
| Submission (armbar)
| Absolute Fighting Championships 15
| 
|align=center| 2
|align=center| 4:37
| Fort Lauderdale, Florida, United States
| 
|-
| Win
|align=center| 6–0
| William McGlothlin
| Submission (guillotine choke)
| Full Throttle 4
| 
|align=center| 2
|align=center| 3:58
| Duluth, Georgia, United States
| 
|-
| Win
|align=center| 5–0
| Jorge Masvidal
| Decision (unanimous)
| Full Throttle 1
| 
|align=center| 3
|align=center| 5:00
| Duluth, Georgia, United States
| 
|-
| Win
|align=center| 4–0
| Brandon Bledsoe
| Submission (armbar)
| ISCF: Compound Fracture 2
| 
|align=center| 1
|align=center| 2:31
| Atlanta, Georgia, United States
| 
|-
| Win
|align=center| 3–0
| Chad Lawshe
| Submission (guillotine choke)
| ISCF: Compound Fracture
| 
|align=center| 1
|align=center| 0:54
| Atlanta, Georgia, United States
| 
|-
| Win
|align=center| 2–0
| Scott Johnson
| Submission (armbar)
| ISCF: Anarchy in 2 August
| 
|align=center| 1
|align=center| 2:41
| Atlanta, Georgia, United States
|
|-
| Win
|align=center| 1–0
| Chris Clark
| TKO (punches)
| ISCF: Friday Night Fight
| 
|align=center| 1
|align=center| N/A
| Atlanta, Georgia, United States
| 
|-

See also
 List of male mixed martial artists

References

External links
 
 

1982 births
Living people
Brazilian male mixed martial artists
Featherweight mixed martial artists
Mixed martial artists utilizing Muay Thai
Mixed martial artists utilizing Shotokan
Mixed martial artists utilizing Brazilian jiu-jitsu
Ultimate Fighting Championship male fighters
Brazilian Muay Thai practitioners
Brazilian male karateka
Brazilian practitioners of Brazilian jiu-jitsu
People awarded a black belt in Brazilian jiu-jitsu
Sportspeople from Recife
Brazilian expatriate sportspeople in the United States